Dubai Challenge Cup, also known as the Dubai Football Challenge, is a friendly football tournament founded by Mohammed bin Rashed and the United Arab Emirates national football team. It was first held in January 2007, with another tournament scheduled for January 2008, with both won by German side Hamburger SV.

2007 tournament
The 2007 Dubai Challenge Cup was played in January 2007 by four teams: United Arab Emirates, Iran, Hamburger SV and VfB Stuttgart.

Group classification

Group matches

Champion

2008 tournament

The 2008 Dubai Challenge Cup was played in January 2008 by four teams: United Arab Emirates, China PR, Hamburger SV and Vasco da Gama.

Group classification

Group matches

Champion

2009 tournament
The 2009 Dubai Challenge Cup was played on 6 January 2009 by Milan and Hamburger SV in a single match.

Match

Champion

2011 tournament
The 2011 Dubai Challenge Cup was played at 2 January 2011 by Al-Ahli and Milan in a single match.

Match

Champion

2012 tournament
The 2012 Dubai Challenge Cup was played at 4 January 2012 by Milan and Paris Saint-Germain in a single match.

Match

Champion

2014 tournament
The 2014 Dubai Challenge Cup was played at 30 December 2014 by Real Madrid and Milan in a single match.

2014 match

2014 champion

Cups by team

 Milan (2009, 2011, 2012 and 2014) 4 times
 Hamburger SV (2007 and 2008) 2 times

See also
Dubai Cup
Match World Cup

External links
Official site

 
Emirati football friendly trophies
United Arab Emirates national football team